The St. Thomas Raceway Park is a drag racing course that is utilized both by the professional drivers of NHRA North Central Division in addition to the local amateur competitors; which spans a distance of .

Summary

General information
There is a variety of racing events from early April to mid November (usually on a Friday night, Saturday, or Sunday afternoon). It is located near Sparta (Elgin County), Ontario, Canada and is a reasonable driving distance from the larger town of St. Thomas. During the season, there is a possibility for night racing in addition to daytime racing. Hours of operation are considered to be six hours long for all events while time trials generally take place 30–60 minutes after the gates open. Racers on the raceway park tend to be locals who live within  of the track in places like Tillsonburg, London, St. Thomas, Woodstock, and Windsor. The St. Thomas Raceway Park is owned by Sprite Investments who also own the only other drag race track in Ontario.

All cars must pass inspection by the in-house inspectors. If a car doesn't pass inspection, it doesn't get to race that day. Since the raceway is technically private property, racers who lose their cool will be ejected from the facility. DOT-approved helmets are required for the races and all articles must be removed from the trunk of the vehicle. All decisions (about inspection, class assignment, and qualification) are final and the staff has absolute authority. Burnouts are only permitted in the specially designated "burnout box." It has been highly controversial to members of the surrounding community and does not conform to current law's and regulation specific to racetracks.

Speed records
The fastest speed ever achieved at St. Thomas Raceway Park was by Jim Epler on July 2, 2000.

References

External links
 https://www.stthomasdragway.ca/

1962 establishments in Ontario
2009 disestablishments in Ontario
Buildings and structures in St. Thomas, Ontario
Drag racing venues in Canada
Motorsport venues in Ontario
Tourist attractions in Elgin County
Sports venues completed in 1962